Bothriomyrmex crosi is a species of ant in the genus Bothriomyrmex. Described by Santschi in 1919, the species is found in  Algeria, Morocco, and Tunisia.

References

Bothriomyrmex
Hymenoptera of Africa
Insects of North Africa
Insects described in 1919